Chyorny/Cherny (masculine), Chyornaya/Chernaya (feminine), or Chyornoye/Chernoye (neuter) may refer to:
Daniil Chyorny (c. 1360–1430), Russian icon painter
Vadim Chyorny (born 1997), Russian football player.
Chyorny (inhabited locality) (Chyornaya, Chyornoye), name of several rural localities in Russia
Chorny Volcano, a stratovolcano in Kamchatka Krai, Russia
Chyornaya River, name of several rivers in Russia and Ukraine

See also
Chorny, Ukrainian last name